The Toplița (also: Lomaș) is a river in the Călimani Mountains, Harghita County, central Romania. It is a right tributary of the river Mureș. It joins the Mureș in the town Toplița. It is fed by several smaller streams, including Puturosu, Purcelu, Voivodeasa, Hurdugașu, Pârâul Sec and Fagul Rusului.

References

Rivers of Romania
Rivers of Harghita County
Toplița